André Gil Gomes Correia Costa (born 9 February 1979), known as Correia, is a Portuguese retired footballer who played as a central defender.

Club career
Born in Porto, Correia was a youth product of hometown's FC Porto, never appearing officially for its first team and going to play three Primeira Liga matches with F.C. Alverca in the 2000–01 season. From January 2002–June 2005 he represented, in the second division, Alverca, F.C. Penafiel, G.D. Chaves and S.C. Espinho.

Correia was one of five Portuguese players signed by South China AA in the 2006 off-season along with compatriot manager António Amaral, being referred by the team and local media as André Costa. After a series of disappointing performances he was released, returning to his country and going on to resume his career exclusively in the third level, with a host of clubs.

International career
Correia represented Portugal at the 1999 FIFA World Youth Championship in Nigeria, making three appearances in an eventual round-of-16 exit.

References

External links

1979 births
Living people
Footballers from Porto
Portuguese footballers
Association football defenders
Primeira Liga players
Liga Portugal 2 players
Segunda Divisão players
FC Porto B players
F.C. Maia players
F.C. Alverca players
F.C. Penafiel players
G.D. Chaves players
S.C. Espinho players
Gondomar S.C. players
Hong Kong First Division League players
South China AA players
Portugal youth international footballers
Portugal under-21 international footballers
Portuguese expatriate footballers
Expatriate footballers in Hong Kong
Portuguese expatriate sportspeople in China
Portuguese expatriate sportspeople in Hong Kong